Jaloo may refer to:

 Jaloo, Libya, a city in Libya
Jalo oasis
 Jaloo, Khyber Pakhtunkhwa, a Union Council of Mansehra District in Khyber-Pakhtunkhwa, Pakistan

See also 
 Jalo (name), a Finnish given name and surname